The IMPACT Coalition is an urban debate league (UDL) based in the New York metropolitan area. It organises debating competitions and provides supporting services.

History

The organisation was founded in 1991 in order to facilitate policy debate competitions among high schools in the New York metropolitan area. It also collaborated with higher educational institutes in New York, such as Columbia University, Rockland Community College, and Queens College, in order to create a debating program called the NY Coalition of Colleges.

In 1994, the organisation created a program called the Public Forum Debate League (PFDL), in order to facilitate the travel of geographically remote students to debate competitions. The organisation also collaborated with Yeshiva University in order to facilitate debate competitions with religious groups.

See also 

 Competitive debate in the United States

References

External links
IMPACT Coalition

Youth organizations based in New York City
Urban debate leagues